was one of four principal naval shipyards owned and operated by the Imperial Japanese Navy, and was located at Yokosuka, Kanagawa prefecture on Tokyo Bay, south of Yokohama.

History

In 1866, the Tokugawa shogunate government established the Yokosuka Seisakusho, a military arsenal and naval base, with the help of foreign engineers, including the French naval architect Léonce Verny. The new facility was intended to produce modern, western-style warships and equipment for the Tokugawa navy. The construction of the arsenal was an important first step for the modernization of Japan's industry. Modern buildings, an aqueduct, foundry, brick factories, and technical schools to train Japanese technicians were established.

After the Boshin War and the Meiji Restoration, the new Meiji government took over control of the facility in 1871, renaming it the Yokosuka Zosenjo (Yokosuka Shipyards). The first dry dock was opened in 1871, and is still in operation today. Japan's first domestically produced warship, Saiki, was completed the same year.

The Yokosuka Naval District was established at Yokosuka, Kanagawa, in 1884, as the first of the naval districts responsible for the defense of the Japanese home islands, and the Yokosuka Shipyards was renamed the Yokosuka Naval Arsenal in 1903. Japan had purchased five submarines from the American Electric Boat Company during the Russo-Japanese War of 1904–1905. These Holland Type VII submarines were built by Arthur Leopold Busch as he traveled to Japan during this time. Busch was a naval architect and shipbuilder who represented the newly organized company Electric Boat Company, now located at the Quincy, Massachusetts shipyard known as the Fore River Ship and Engine Company. These first five submarines became Japan's (IJN) initial entry into the theater of underwater warfare that began nearly the same time as the outbreak of the war. Another representative of Electric Boat, Frank Cable, an electrician working for Isaac L. Rice's company, trained two Japanese crews in the operation of such craft.

Arthur Busch was also the man responsible for building the United States Navy's first submarine some five or so years before this time for the Holland Torpedo Boat Company. Two additional Holland-designed submarines were built for Japan by 1906 "under contract" and a licensing "agreement" with Holland's company back in 1905. These pioneering submarines progressively got larger and larger as time went on, climaxing (in size) by the end of the Cold War. In 1909, Japan's first domestically designed and produced battleship, was launched.

Naval aircraft were designed at the nearby Yokosuka Naval Air Technical Arsenal.

During the Pacific War, the Yokosuka Naval Arsenal was attacked by one bomber during the Doolittle Raid on 18 April 1942 and by a large force of carrier aircraft during the Attack on Yokosuka on 18 July 1945. The facilities were seized by Allied forces at the end of World War II, and on 15 October 1945 the Yokosuka Naval Arsenal was officially abolished.

However, the facilities continued to be used in the post-World War II period, by the U.S. Navy as the Yokosuka Ship Repair Facility and its former property is now under the control of the U.S. Fleet Activities Yokosuka.

A steam hammer from the former Yokosuka Naval Arsenal is on display at the Verny Commemorative Museum in Yokosuka.

Examples of ships built at Yokosuka Naval Arsenal

Capital ships

Battleship 
, Satsuma-class semi-dreadnought
, Fusō-class battleship
Owari (Unfinished), Kii-class battleship
, Nagato-class battleship

Battlecruiser 
, Ibuki-class armoured cruiser
, Kongō-class battlecruiser
 (Unfinished), Amagi-class battlecruiser

Fleet Aircraft Carriers 
Fleet carrier Hiryū
, Shōkaku-class fleet carrier
, Unryū-class fleet carrier

Shinano, Yamato-class battleship, later converted to a support aircraft carrier (July 1942)

Support Aircraft Carriers 
Shinano, converted from Yamato-class battleship

Smaller ships

Cruisers 
, Myōkō-class Heavy cruiser
, Takao-class Heavy cruiser
, Mogami-class Heavy cruiser
Hashidate, Matsushima-class Protected cruiser
, Tenryū-class Light cruiser
, Agano-class Light cruiser

Light Carriers 

, Zuihō-class Light carrier

Converted carrier

Destroyers Classes 
Harusame-class: 4 ships
Kamikaze-class(1905): 8 ships
Matsu/Tachibana-class: 26 ships

Submarine Classes 
Type B (Type B, B Kai-1,Kai-2): 9 ships
Type D (Type D and D Kai): 6 ships
Kaidai (Kaidai IIIa, IIIb, VII): 6 ships
Kaichū (Kaichu III, IV): 5 ships

Notes

References

Further reading

Imperial Japanese Navy
Shipbuilding companies of Japan
Defunct companies of Japan
Arsenals
Yokosuka